The 25th World Scout Jamboree will be held August 1–12, 2023 at Saemangeum, North Jeolla, South Korea, hosted by Korea Scout Association with the theme, "Draw Your Dream". About 30,000 to 50,000 participants are expected to attend.

The theme, "Draw your Dream!" expresses the desire of Scout Movement members to transform the 25th World Scout Jamboree into their own festival and grow dreams through the event. Saemangeum, an estuarine tidal flat on the coast of the Yellow Sea in South Korea, is being shaped into a spacious jamboree area, giving young Scouts from around the world an opportunity to purse their hopes and dreams throughout the Jamboree. The campsite is flat, overlooks the sea on one side and features a view of the mountains. It is situated closely to Byeonsanbando National Park (Byeonsan Peninsula) located on the West Coast of Jeollabuk-do. The site is about 8.8 km2 and spreads out on a wide piece of land measuring 6.2 km X 1.7 km (based on the longest points).

This is the second time a World Scout Jamboree is held in Korea. In 1991, the 17th World Scout Jamboree was successfully held in 1991 in Goseong, Gangwon-do with 19,093 participants from 135 countries under the theme of "Many Lands, One World". Other host nations having hosted a World Scout Jamboree more than once are United Kingdom (four times; 1920, 1929, 1957 and 2007), United States (twice; 1967 and 2019 (co-hosted with Canada and Mexico)), Japan (twice; 1971 and 2015), Canada (three times; 1955, 1983 and 2019 (co-hosted with Mexico and United States)), Netherlands (twice; 1937 and 1995).

World Scout Jamborees are attended by Youth Participants (14-18 years old at the time of the jamboree) and adult volunteers, serving in the capacity as Adult Leaders (AL), Contingent Management Team (CMT) members and International Service Team (IST) members.

The smallest units are patrols. One patrol consists of nine Youth Participants (YP) and one Adult Leader (AL). Four patrols, or 36 YPs and 4 ALs, make up a Unit.

The two candidate countries for the 2023 World Jamboree were Poland and South Korea. The World Organization of the Scout Movement was to have selected the host country in 2014 at the 40th World Scout Conference in Ljubljana, Slovenia, however this was postponed past the 23rd World Scout Jamboree, where both contingents still made bids.

On 16 August 2017, during the 41st World Scout Conference in Baku, Azerbaijan, the World Organization of the Scout Movement announced that the 25th World Scout Jamboree would be held in South Korea.

Programme
There are five pillars making up the jamboree program; Scouting for Life, Smart & Scientific, Safe & Secure, Sustainability and ACT (Adventure, Culture, Tradition).
Scouting for Life: Refers to activities enabling participants to develop leadership and life skills through Scouting activities, challenge their perception about global issues and encouraging them to become active citizens. It incorporates Scouting's values, methods and current emphasis concerning global citizenship education and sustainable development education.
Smart & Scientific: Refers to activities featuring the latest technology, from robotics to virtual reality, with a stream of Science, Technology, Engineering and Mathematics (STEM) programmes.
Safe & Secure: Refers to activities educating and raising awareness to prevent and respond to communicable diseases, natural disasters, and other emergencies. It will also showcase Korea Scout Association's diverse safety education programmes. These are aimed at improving the ability of participants responding to danger and contributing as responders in emergencies.
Sustainability: Refers to activities educating and raising awareness about United Nation's Sustainable Development Goals, and methods so that participants can act as peace messengers and promote sustainable development in their respective communities. The jamboree will feature Better World Tent and Global Development Village where participants learn about their role and connection with nature, procedures to create a culture of peace and dialogue, promote diversity and inclusion, and more.
ACT (Adventure, Culture, Tradition): Refers to various adventurous activities featuring the environment and diverse terrain around Saemangeum, including the mountains and rivers, cross-cultural exchanges to experience the best of Korean culture and tradition from K-pop music to Bibimbap food to the Hangul alphabet and others.

Candidacy

Both the ZHP (Polish Scouting and Guiding Association) and Korea Scout Association (KSA) launched bids to host the 25th World Scout Jamboree.

The ZHP's proposed theme, "Be the Spark". received support from the city of Gdańsk to host the jamboree. Mayor Paweł Adamowicz wrote an article for the Huffington Post explaining Gdańsk's as an ideal host city.

Korea Scout Association's proposed theme, "Draw Your Dream", with the proposed location for the jamboree at Saemangeum, supported by the Jeollabuk-do Provincial Government and Korea Government's Ministry of Gender Equality and Family. The jamboree also will celebrate the Scouting centenary in Korea. Korean President Moon Jae-in and former United Nations Secretary-General Ban Ki-moon actively and publicly promoted KSA's candidacy.

References

External links 
 
 
 

2023
World Scout Jamboree 25th
World Scout Jamboree 25th